Bandits of El Dorado is a 1949 American Western film directed by Ray Nazarro and written by Barry Shipman. The film stars Charles Starrett, George J. Lewis, Fred F. Sears, John Dehner, Clayton Moore and Smiley Burnette. The film was released on October 20, 1949, by Columbia Pictures.

Plot

Cast          
Charles Starrett as Steve Carson / The Durango Kid
George J. Lewis as José Vargas
Fred F. Sears as Captain Richard Henley 
John Dehner as Charles Bruton
Clayton Moore as B. F. Morgan
Smiley Burnette as Smiley Burnette

References

External links
 

1949 films
1940s English-language films
American Western (genre) films
1949 Western (genre) films
Columbia Pictures films
Films directed by Ray Nazarro
American black-and-white films
1940s American films